Agell is a surname. Notable people with the surname include:

Carl-Oscar Agell (1894–1983), Swedish Army officer
Charlotte Agell (born 1959), American writer
Karl Agell (born 1966), Canadian rock singer
Pepe Agell (born 1984), Spanish entrepreneur 
José Agell (born 1882), Spanish chemist-physicist